Newman Congregational Church is an historic church at 100 Newman Avenue in East Providence, Rhode Island.  It is a two-story wood-frame structure on a high brick basement.  It was built in 1810 for a congregation that was established in 1643, when the area was part of Rehoboth, Massachusetts, and is the oldest Congregationalist organization in Rhode Island.

History
The Newman Congregational Church was established by the Rev. Samuel Newman (1602-1663) of Weymouth, Massachusetts. In 1641, he and most of his congregation purchased a tract of land in Plymouth Colony called Seacunk, located east of Providence, Rhode Island. Newman named the new town Rehoboth, and soon afterwards a Congregational church was formed there.

In 1812, the town of Rehoboth, Massachusetts, was divided in two, and the church location was assigned to the new town of Seekonk. In 1862, the western part of the town of Seekonk became part of the state of Rhode Island and received the name East Providence.

The church building was listed on the National Register of Historic Places in 1980.

See also
National Register of Historic Places listings in Providence County, Rhode Island

References

External links
Newman Congregational Church official website

Churches completed in 1810
19th-century United Church of Christ church buildings
United Church of Christ churches in Rhode Island
Churches on the National Register of Historic Places in Rhode Island
Buildings and structures in East Providence, Rhode Island
Churches in Providence County, Rhode Island
National Register of Historic Places in Providence County, Rhode Island